Ernest J. Windmiller (July 24, 1897 – November 4, 1971) was an American politician and businessman.

Windmiller was born in Cresco, Howard County, Iowa and served in the United States Army during World War I. He lived in Fergus Falls, Otter Tail County, Minnesota with his wife family and was the owner 0f ;;--Star Laundry and Cleaners. Windmiller served on the Fergus Falls City Council and in the Minnesota House of Representatives from 1943 to 1960. Windmiller died at St. Luke's Hospital in Fargo, North Dakota and his funeral and burial was in Fergus Falls, Minnesota.

References

1897 births
1971 deaths
Military personnel from Iowa
People from Cresco, Iowa
People from Fergus Falls, Minnesota
Businesspeople from Minnesota
Minnesota city council members
Members of the Minnesota House of Representatives
United States Army personnel of World War I